Yatesville can refer to these places in the United States:

Yatesville, Georgia
Yatesville, Ohio, an unincorporated community
Yatesville, Pennsylvania
Yatesville Dam, Kentucky
Yatesville Lake State Park in Kentucky, created by Yatesville Dam